Snow Spring is an unincorporated community in Dooly County, in the U.S. state of Georgia.

History
Variant names were "Snow" and "Snow Springs". A post office called Snow was established in 1879, and remained in operation until 1905. The community was so named from the white "snowy" sand in a spring near the original town site.

References

Unincorporated communities in Georgia (U.S. state)
Unincorporated communities in Dooly County, Georgia